Santa Esmeralda is a French-American disco group formed in the 1970s. The group had hits with its remake of the 1960s hits "Don't Let Me Be Misunderstood" and "House of the Rising Sun". Santa Esmeralda featured original lead singer Leroy Gómez in 1977-1978 and singer Jimmy Goings from late 1978 until 1983. Gómez rejoined the group in the 1990s.

History 

The band was formed in 1977 by French producers Nicolas Skorsky and Jean Manuel de Scarano, singer-songwriters who launched a label with the aim of producing artists who would record their compositions. Upon meeting singer Leroy Gómez in Paris, the duo recruited him for the group's first record, "Don't Let Me Be Misunderstood", which debuted on the independent French label, Fauves Puma. A sudden success in Europe, the record was picked up for worldwide distribution by Casablanca Records.

"Don't Let Me Be Misunderstood" 

Originally written in 1964 for Nina Simone, her version had failed to chart, and the song was picked up by rock group The Animals the following year. The essential nature of the song is Latin and flamenco, which combined with that urgency lent itself to the disco sensibility in the 1970s. The song became a hit all over again, first topping the U.S. Disco chart and then matching the #15 peak of The Animals' version on the Billboard Hot 100. The album was certified gold. The flip side of the record featured the love ballad "You're My Everything" which became a radio request song and received airplay, even though the song never charted. Despite the success of the record, Gomez did not record any subsequent record with Santa Esmeralda's original production team.

"The House of the Rising Sun" 

After the band's first album, singer Jimmy Goings was brought in to replace Leroy Gomez. In late 1977 Santa Esmeralda scored a top 20 disco hit with a dance version of another song made famous by The Animals, "The House of the Rising Sun". In 1978 they recorded the song "Sevilla Nights" for the Thank God It's Friday soundtrack. In addition to their contribution to that hit soundtrack, their album The House of the Rising Sun also appeared on the pop and black charts that year. Following the success of their first two albums, they had a minor club hit with their 1978 album Beauty, and returned to the disco Top 20 with "Another Cha-Cha/Cha-Cha Suite", which peaked at #16 in 1979. The album featured extensive writing from Goings which would continue for the rest of the band's existence. In 1980, the group released Don't Be Shy Tonight as internal conflict started to form between the producers of the group, this time scoring a hit with "C'est Magnifique". In 1981, Skorsky produced Hush and 1982's Green Talisman. Don't Be Shy Tonight, Hush and Green Talisman marked the band's foray into experimentation with a wider variety of sounds including reggae.

Tours around the world 

Santa Esmeralda also toured extensively throughout the world. During this time the live band included musicians Tony Baker (guitar), Mick Valentino (guitar), Charlie Magarian (bass), Jimmy Sanchez (drums), Tom Poole (trumpet) and Reggie Graham (keyboards).

In 2011, footage of the band's performance at the Viña del Mar International Song Festival, Chile, in 1979 was released on DVD by the European company Soul Collectors.

Santa Esmeralda (starring Leroy Gómez) is still touring throughout the world (EEG - Europolis Entertainment Group).

Later recordings 

In 2002, Gómez, who had been touring with a new incarnation of the group, released Lay Down My Love, an album of new material, and in 2004 Santa Esmeralda - The Greatest Hits, featuring newly recorded versions of the band's disco-era hits, including those which had been sung by Goings. Essentially unaffiliated with the original producers and musicians aside from Gómez, the new releases feature a much more synthesized sound then previous recordings.
The group re-entered the popular consciousness in 2003 when "Don't Let Me Be Misunderstood" appeared on the soundtrack to the first volume of Quentin Tarantino's Kill Bill.

Discography

References

External links 

 Official website (English/French)
 [ Entry at Allmusic]
 Visit Santa Esmeralda on MySpace for more info.
 Visit Santa Esmeralda on Facebook for music, photos and latest updates.

French disco groups
Musical groups established in 1977